KFU may refer to:

Kazan Federal University
King Faisal University